The Atlantic Avenue–Barclays Center station (formerly Atlantic Avenue/Pacific Street station) is a New York City Subway station complex shared by the BMT Fourth Avenue Line, the BMT Brighton Line and the IRT Eastern Parkway Line, located at Atlantic, Fourth, and Flatbush Avenues and Pacific Street in Downtown Brooklyn. The complex is served by the 2, 4, D, N, Q and R trains at all times; the 3 train at all times except late nights; the 5 and B trains during weekdays; and a few rush-hour W trains.

As of 2019, it is the busiest subway station in Brooklyn, with 13,939,794 passengers, and is ranked 20th overall. The control house has been listed on the National Register of Historic Places since 1980, while the station complex as a whole has been listed on the National Register of Historic Places since 2004, and is ADA-compliant.

History 

The IRT Eastern Parkway Line station was built first, in 1908, the terminal of a four-stop subway extension from Lower Manhattan to Downtown Brooklyn via the Joralemon Street Tunnel. The station's control house, a grand, ornate entrance to what was then the terminal of the Interborough Rapid Transit Company's Brooklyn lines, was designed by Heins & LaFarge, who also built the Cathedral of St. John the Divine in Morningside Heights, Manhattan. This control house was listed on the National Register of Historic Places in 1980; however, the actual entrance is now removed and now serves as a skylight into the IRT station.

To address overcrowding, in 1909, the New York Public Service Commission proposed lengthening platforms at stations along the original IRT subway. As part of a modification to the IRT's construction contracts, made on January 18, 1910, the company was to lengthen station platforms  to accommodate ten-car express and six-car local trains. In addition to $1.5 million (equivalent to $ million in ) spent on platform lengthening, $500,000 was spent on building additional entrances and exits. It was anticipated that these improvements would increase capacity by 25 percent. The island platform at the Atlantic Avenue station on the modern Eastern Parkway Line was extended  to the east. On January 23 and 24, 1911, ten-car express trains began running.

The city government took over the BMT's operations on June 1, 1940, and the IRT's operations on June 12, 1940. During the 1964–1965 fiscal year, the Brighton Line platforms at Atlantic Avenue, along with those at six other stations on the Brighton Line, were lengthened to 615 feet to accommodate a ten-car train of 60-foot IND cars, or a nine-car train of 67-foot BMT cars.

The station was overhauled in the late 1970s. The Metropolitan Transportation Authority (MTA) fixed the station's structure and overhauled its appearance. It refurbished the wall tilings and replaced the old signs and incandescent lighting with modern fixtures. It also fixed the staircases and platform edges. On January 16, 1978, the ex-IRT and ex-BMT stations were connected into a single station complex, eliminating a "double fare" that formerly was required to transfer between the Atlantic Avenue IRT/BMT platforms and the Fourth Avenue BMT side of the station.

The station complex underwent another major overhaul from 1999 to 2003, using funds from the 1987 capital program; the $49 million in funding from that program had been delayed in 1994 due to the MTA's budget issues. This time the station received state of the art repairs and was updated for ADA-accessibility, with the installation of eight elevators in the station, as well as the widening or construction of fifteen staircases. The MTA repaired the staircases, re-tiled the walls and floors, upgraded the station's lights and the public address system, installed ADA yellow safety threads along the platform edge, installed new trackbeds for local and express trains entering the IRT station, and widened the 100-year-old passageways between the stations. An escalator was replaced at Hanson Place, the kiosk on Times Plaza was rehabilitated, and a new station entrance was added at Hanson Place. To achieve this, the entire IRT station had to be supported by large  crossbeams hanging from the roof of the station box, a construction technique that had never been used previously; the station was also supported by conventional columns from below. In 2004, the entire station was made a NRHP landmark. Late that year, the MTA installed elevators on both sides of the platform and street level to accommodate wheelchairs and those with disabilities.

In June 2009, the MTA sold the naming rights of the station complex to Forest City Ratner Companies for 20 years at $200,000 per year, one of the few such renames in the system (Willets Point–Shea Stadium, in Queens, was another example of a station with such naming rights, until the MTA simply renamed it to Mets–Willets Point following Shea Stadium's demolition). Barclays Center, whose naming rights were bought by Barclays Bank, opened September 2012 and is part of Forest City Ratner Companies' Pacific Park project. As a result, the station was renamed to its present name, Atlantic Avenue–Barclays Center, in May 2012. A new mezzanine and fare control area was built near the sports complex. Following this rename and the addition of a new exit, the MTA has considered selling the naming rights of other subway stations.

The MTA announced in December 2021 that it would install wide-aisle fare gates for disabled passengers at five subway stations, including Atlantic Avenue–Barclays Center, by mid-2022. The implementation of these fare gates was delayed; the MTA's chief accessibility officer indicated in February 2023 that the new fare gates would be installed at the Atlantic Avenue–Barclays Center and  stations shortly afterward. The MTA announced in late 2022 that it would open customer service centers at 15 stations; the centers would provide services such as travel information and OMNY farecards. The first six customer service centers, including one at the Atlantic Avenue–Barclays Center station, were to open in early 2023. The Atlantic Avenue–Barclays Center station's customer service center opened in February 2023.

Station layout

The station consists of three levels.

Exits
To the Fourth Avenue portion of the complex:
 Stair to NW corner of 4th Avenue and Pacific Street
  Stair and elevator to NE corner of 4th Avenue and Pacific Street

To the Eastern Parkway/Brighton portion of the complex:
 Stair to western corner of Hanson Place and St. Felix Street
  Stair and elevator to southern corner of Hanson Place and St. Felix Street
 Passageway to 1 Hanson Place
 Two stairs to north side of Flatbush Avenue southeast of Hanson Place
  Passageway to Atlantic Terminal Station
 Stair and escalators to Barclays Center at SE corner of Atlantic and Flatbush Avenues

The Eastern Parkway Line platforms had an underpass with exits to the north and south sides of Flatbush Avenue between Atlantic Avenue and Pacific Street. The exit to the north side was replaced with a larger single entrance near Barclays Center and sealed. The exit to the south side was retained as an emergency exit.

IRT Eastern Parkway Line platforms 

The Atlantic Avenue–Barclays Center station (originally Atlantic Avenue station) is an express station on the IRT Eastern Parkway Line which has four tracks, one island platform, and two side platforms. On the center platform, there are two old indicator signs which mark the next train, formerly used for non-rush hour short turn trains. An old style sign to the Brooklyn Academy of Music also exists. The trackway to the Long Island Rail Road Atlantic Branch is still visible at the north end of the northbound local track, although much of it is behind corrugated wall; more information about this and other unused trackways is at Bergen Street. The LIRR Atlantic Terminal platforms, slightly lower, are clearly visible through floor-to-ceiling railings.

This station has been completely renovated. The northbound local trackway and track have been completely redone with concrete base and welded rail.

The IRT Eastern Parkway Line platform has a passageway to the BMT Fourth Avenue and Brighton Lines under the platforms, with the Fourth Avenue Line to the southwest and the Brighton Line to the northeast. Another passageway between the Eastern Parkway and Brighton Line is present at the south end of the station, which also leads to an exit immediately adjacent to Barclays Center. The Barclays Center exit features a part-time booth that is staffed during events at the arena and two escalators.

Although the station is wheelchair accessible, the Eastern Parkway Line express platform was formerly too narrow in some areas to accommodate wheelchairs. Passengers were notified of this fact by announcements on trains before reaching the station. The stairs have since been trimmed in width to allow full wheelchair access.

North of this station, there is an unused trackway, splitting from the southbound local track for a proposed subway under Fourth Avenue (later built as the BMT Fourth Avenue Line). It merges with the Manhattan-bound express track and ends on a bumper block between the two express tracks at Nevins Street. When this station originally opened in 1908 it was the terminal for the line, and had two side platforms, an island platform, and two tracks. All the platforms were connected together at their southern ends.

This station is one of three express stations to have side platforms for local services and a center island platform for express services, the other two being the 34th Street–Penn Station stops on the IND Eighth Avenue Line and the IRT Broadway–Seventh Avenue Line respectively. The reason for this is that the Atlantic Avenue station was originally planned as a two-track station with only the island (express) platform; the side (local) platforms were added to the plans when construction was already underway. However, this layout helps to reduce overcrowding because the station is connected to Atlantic Terminal, and the next station west from Atlantic Avenue, Nevins Street, is also an express station with the more common two-island-platform configuration. This limits overcrowding by preventing cross-platform interchanges between local and express services.

BMT Brighton Line platform 

The Atlantic Avenue–Barclays Center station (originally Atlantic Avenue station) on the BMT Brighton Line has two tracks and an island platform.

The platform has seven staircases, three to the main mezzanine, two to the Hanson Place exit at the north end, which is an escalator that leads to a separate mezzanine with no transfers to the other lines and two at the south end, which leads to both an exit immediately adjacent to Barclays Center and another mezzanine that connects to the IRT platforms. The Barclays Center exit features a part-time booth that is staffed during events at the arena and two escalators.

The street staircase on the Hanson Place mezzanine leads to the Williamsburgh Savings Bank Tower. The exit at Hanson Place once had a booth that has since been removed. The lower level of this mezzanine had a passageway, now sealed, that ran above the platform from Hanson Place. The "To Hanson Place" and other signs are covered up. This area is now space used by MTA employees with the entrance at the other side.

The main mezzanine also has an out-of-system passageway to the LIRR's Atlantic Terminal and the full-time fare control at the IRT side of the station. Two of the street staircases lead to the Atlantic Terminal Mall. Lightboxes with rotating content line these walls. There is a removed staircase in between the two sets of stairs. The northernmost staircase was added during renovation, while the other two staircases were narrowed in order to comply with ADA guidelines regarding minimum 36-inch width clearances.

A platform extension is clearly visible at the south end of the platform, where the name tablets and "A" are authentic replicas on the northbound platform wall, while the southbound wall was tiled around them. The area on the southbound wall where the platform extends out is made of replicas as well. Since there were no mosaics built, only a green wall was present prior to renovation, which indicates where the platform was extended in the 1964–1965 to fit ten car trains.

North of this station, a bellmouth is visible from a Manhattan-bound train. The bellmouth was for the proposed Ashland Place Connection which would have connected to the now-demolished BMT Fulton Street El.

BMT Fourth Avenue Line platforms 

The Atlantic Avenue–Barclays Center station (originally Pacific Street station then Atlantic Avenue–Pacific Street station) is an express station on the BMT Fourth Avenue Line that has four tracks and two island platforms. It opened on June 22, 1915. A wall separates the two platforms.

At the north end of the BMT Fourth Avenue platforms, two staircases and one elevator go up to the main fare control area, where a turnstile bank provides access to/from the station and two staircases going up to either northern corners of Pacific Street and Fourth Avenue. The northeast corner also has an elevator going down to the mezzanine. A pathway connects to the rest of the complex.

BMT Fifth Avenue Line station

The station complex formerly had an elevated portion on the BMT Fifth Avenue Line, called Atlantic Avenue. It was served by trains of the BMT Culver Line and BMT Fifth Avenue Line and had two tracks and one island platform. It was located at Flatbush Avenue and Atlantic Avenue, right above the headhouse for the current complex. It also served the St. Johns Place Line, Flatbush Avenue Line, Third Avenue Line, and Seventh Avenue Line streetcars.

On June 25, 1923, two cars of a train coming from 65th Street Terminal derailed and fell towards Flatbush Avenue. Eight passengers died and many were injured. With increased use of the subways compared to the elevated lines, and the completion of the unification of the city's three subway systems, the Fifth Avenue Line was closed at midnight on June 1, 1940, and was demolished in 1941.

Gallery

Hook, Line and Sinker 
This is a three-part art installation made by George Trakas for the 2004 renovation of the station.

References

Further reading

External links 

 
 
 
  (includes current and former track configurations, and provisions for future connections)
 MTA's Arts For Transit — Atlantic Avenue–Pacific Street

IRT Eastern Parkway Line stations
BMT Brighton Line stations
BMT Fourth Avenue Line stations
New York City Subway transfer stations
Railway and subway stations on the National Register of Historic Places in New York City
New York City Subway stations in Brooklyn
BMT Fifth Avenue Line stations
Railway stations in the United States opened in 1888
Railway stations closed in 1940
Heins and LaFarge buildings
Downtown Brooklyn
1888 establishments in New York (state)
1940 disestablishments in New York (state)
National Register of Historic Places in Brooklyn